Juice=Juice, pronounced "Juice Juice", is a nine-member Japanese idol girl group formed in 2013. The group originally consisted of six trainee members of Hello! Project. They have released one studio album and twelve singles.

Juice=Juice was nominated for the 2013 TBS Japan Record Award in the category of "Best Newcomer" and won a "New Artist" Award. In February 2016, Juice=Juice starred as a fictionalized version of the group in a Japanese drama called Budokan.

History

2013: Formation and debut 
The formation of the group was announced on February 3, 2013, at a Hello! Project concert held at the Main Hall of the Fukuoka Convention Center. It was revealed that the group would consist of six members: five Hello! Project trainees (Akari Uemura, Sayuki Takagi, Karin Miyamoto, Aina Ōtsuka, and Tomoko Kanazawa) and Yuka Miyazaki from Satoyama Movement, all of the groups under the umbrella of Up-Front Group management.

On February 25, it was announced that the group name is Juice=Juice and a concert series was launched on March 2 called Hello! Project Haru no Dai Kansha Hinamatsuri Festival 2013. In these concerts, the group premiered their upcoming single "Watashi ga Iu Mae ni Dakishimenakya ne". On September 11, they released their debut single which peaked at  2 on Oricon's weekly chart.

In November 2013, Juice=Juice was nominated for the 2013 TBS Japan Record Award in the category of "Best Newcomer" and won a "New Artist" Award. On December 5, Juice=Juice released their second single which included the songs "Ijiwaru Shinai de Dakishimete yo" and "Hajimete wo Keiken-chuu". It outperformed their prior release by selling 45,834 copies.

2014–2015: Live tour and chart topper 
On February 27, 2014, Juice=Juice released their first official group photo-book. Their third single was released on March 19, with the songs "Hadaka no Hadaka no Hadaka no KISS" and "Are Kore Shitai!".  Two days later the group announced its first solo tour, Juice=Juice First Live Tour 2014 News=News ~Kakuchi yori Otodoke Shimasu!~, which performed from June to December.

On July 30, 2014, Juice=Juice released their fourth single, containing the songs "Black Butterfly" and "Kaze ni Fukarete". This was followed by another single on October 1, with "Senobi" and "Date ja nai yo Uchi no Jinsei wa".

Juice=Juice performed their first musical, Koisuru Hello Kitty, from November 19 to 24, 2014.

On April 8, 2015, Juice=Juice released their sixth single, containing the songs "Wonderful World" and "Ça va ? Ça va ?". It was their first single to reach No. 1 on the Oricon Weekly Chart, and the first to not be produced by Tsunku.

On May 2, during the opening concert of Juice=Juice First Live Tour 2015 ~Special Juice~, the group announced their first studio album First Squeeze! would be released on July 15. They also announced their goal to perform at Nippon Budokan in 2016, after building their fanbase by performing 220 shows across Japan.

On October 8, it was announced that Juice=Juice would be starring in a 2016 Fuji TV drama titled Budokan about a fictionalized version of the group called Next You which sought to appear at Nippon Budokan. During the production of the show, which began in November, many of Juice=Juice's lives, events, and appearances were conducted under the name Next You.

2016–2017: Budokan, new line-up, and world tour 
On February 3, 2016, Juice=Juice released their seventh single, under the name Next You, which contained the songs "Next is you!" and "Karada Dake ga Otona ni Nattan ja nai". On February 6, Budokan premiered on Fuji TV.  Extended episodes with an additional 15 minutes of material followed on BS SKY PerfecTV! on February 10.

On May 4, it was announced that Juice=Juice were scheduled to perform a concert at Nippon Budokan on November 7, after completing 220 shows as part of the Live Mission 220 promotion.

On October 26, Juice=Juice released their eighth single, containing the songs "Dream Road ~Kokoro ga Odoridashiteru~", "KEEP ON Joshou Shikou!!" and "Ashita Yarou wa Bakayarou".  A ninth single followed on April 26, 2017, with "Jidanda Dance" and "Feel! Kanjiru yo".  This was followed by the digital release of "Goal ~Ashita wa Acchi da yo~" on May 19 and "Jouro" on June 16.

On June 26, 2017, it was announced that Nanami Yanagawa of Country Girls and Ruru Dambara had joined Juice=Juice and would appear with the group in the Hello! Project 2017 SUMMER concert tour and Juice=Juice LIVE AROUND 2017 ~Seven Horizon~. The first leg of the world tour ran from September 8 to October 1, 2017 with concerts in Mexico, England, France, Germany, Malaysia, Indonesia, and Taiwan. The second leg ran December 12 to 17 in South America.

On August 23, Juice=Juice released their digital single "Fiesta! Fiesta!", which was the first release of the seven-member lineup.

2018– 2022: New members 
On April 18, 2018, Juice=Juice released their tenth single, which included the songs "SEXY SEXY", "Naite Ii yo" and "Vivid Midnight".

On June 13, it was revealed that Manaka Inaba had joined Juice=Juice as a new member and would appear with the group in the Hello! Project 20th Anniversary!! Hello! Project 2018 SUMMER concert tour.

On February 13, 2019, Juice=Juice released their eleventh single, containing the songs "Bi Tansan", "Potsuri to" and "Good Bye & Good Luck!".  It was the group's first single with Manaka Inaba and its last with Nanami Yanagawa. This was followed on June 5 with another single, containing the songs " 'Hitori de Ikiraresō' tte Sore tte nē, Homote Iru no?" and "25-sai Eien Setsu".

On June 14, the group added Yume Kudo and Riai Matsunaga to its lineup.

On February 10, 2020, Karin Miyamoto announced that she will graduate from the group in June and focus on solo activities.

On April 1 it was announced that former Kobushi Factory member Rei Inoue would join the group, officially starting her activities after Karin Miyamoto's graduation.

On February 12, it was announced that Sayuki Takagi has left the group and Hello! Project.

On July 7, it was announced through Hello! Project Station that Hello! Project "Juice=Juice" "Tsubaki Factory" Goudou Shin Member Audition winner Risa Irie and Hello Pro Kenshuusei members Ichika Arisawa and Kisaki Ebata has joined the group as new members.
On October 6, Kanazawa Tomoko announced that she will be graduating from the group and Hello! Project on November 24 to focus on the treatment of her endometriosis.

On November 24, the group held their first concert at Yokohama Arena, titled Juice=Juice Concert 2021 ~FAMILIA~ Kanazawa Tomoko Final. This was also the first concert to feature the new members and Kanazawa's graduation concert. In the concert, Uemura Akari was chosen as the group's new leader following Kanazawa's graduation.

On December 22, the group is set to release their Plastic Love / Familia / Future Smile, which will be the first to feature the new members and Kanazawa's last.

On March 18, 2022, Manaka Inaba announced that she will graduate from the group in May and focus on solo activities.

On April 20, Juice=Juice will release their third studio album, terzo.

On June 29, it was announced through Hello! Project Station that Hello! Project "Juice=Juice" "Morning Musume" Goudou Shin Member Audition winner Akari Endo and Hello Pro Kenshuusei member Sakura Ishiyama has joined the group as new members.

Members

Current
As of June 2022, the group consists of ten members.

 (2013–present) – Leader
 (2017–present) – Sub-leader
 (2019–present)
 (2019–present)
 (2020–present) – Former member of Magnolia Factory (2015–2020)
 (2021–present)
 (2021–present)
 (2021–present)
 (2022–present)
 (2022–present)

Former
 (2013)
 (2017–2019)
 (2013–2019)
 (2013–2020)
 (2013–2021)
 (2013–2021)
 (2018–2022) – Former member of Country Girls

Timeline 

Orange (vertical) = Indie singles
Pink (vertical) = Major singles
Green (vertical) = Studio albums

Discography

Studio albums

Singles

Awards and nominations

Japan Record Awards 

The Japan Record Awards is a major music awards show held annually in Japan by the Japan Composer's Association.

|-
|rowspan=2| 2013
|rowspan=2| Juice=Juice
| New Artist Award
| 
|-
| Best New Artist Award
| 
|}

References

External links 
 
 
 
 

 
2013 establishments in Japan
Child musical groups
Hello! Project
Hello! Project groups
Japanese electropop groups
Japanese girl groups
Japanese idol groups
Japanese pop music groups
Musical groups established in 2013
Musical groups from Tokyo